Wazito Football club is an association football club based Nairobi, Kenya. It is owned by Swedish businessman Ricardo Badoer.

History

Formation
Wazito Football Club was formed in 2011 by the University of Nairobi soccer team and the alumni members of the soccer team. Experienced players mentor the students on career paths and life experiences. The network has created morally upright students who have got jobs upon graduation.

After training together with the students for some time the alumni members decided they could form one strong team to compete in the league. In order to build team identity, in the 2011 season, Wazito played in a lot of friendlies against the league sides and participated in tournaments.

Wazito currently plays in the Federation of Kenya Football (FKF) premier league, the first-tier league in the country.

2012
In 2012 Wazito debuted in the Nairobi County football league, the fifth tier of the Kenyan Football League system. It was a good start for Wazito and they managed to win the league and earn promotion to the Provincial league.

2013
The Nairobi Provincial league was the next hurdle for Wazito. It was another good campaign and a nervy end to the season where Wazito edged off Kangemi United on penalties to emerge as the Nairobi Provincial League winners. This meant back-to-back league titles for Wazito and promotion to the FKF Division one.

2014
FKF Division one was a notch higher as it involved a lot of travel across a number of counties. However, with adequate preseason training and some new signings to beef up the squad it was another good campaign for Wazito. Wazito won the league convincingly and was crowned champions with two games to spare. The Kenyan National Super League was the next stop.

2015
In 2015, the club played in the National Super League, the third tier of the Football Kenya Federation (FKF) league. It was a tough league which also meant extensive travels throughout the country for the team. For the first time, the team did not win the league but came second after Kenya Police. This earned the two teams' promotions to the second-division league of FKF.

2016
The second-tier league was renamed National Super League (NSL) by the new Football Kenya Federation. Wazito was among 20 clubs that played in the league. It turned out to be the toughest league for the team. At the end of the season, Wazito ended at position 11 with 51 points. The club will therefore still play in the same league in the 2017 season.

2017
Wazito FC earned a promotion to Kenyan Premier League for the first time in their history after finishing second in the National Super League. The team was under coach Frank Ouna.

2018
Wazito's stay in the top-flight was however shot-lived as they got relegated at the end of their first season. They were however handed a boost when Swedish businessman Ricardo Badoer acquired the club and pumped money into the team. They acquired some of the best players in the country to help the team earn promotion back to the top tier.

2019
Wazito earned promotion back to the top league after winning the National Super League title.

2020
During the 2019/20 season that ended prematurely in March due to Covid-19, Wazito finished 13th in the FKF Premier League. Only 23 out of the 34 games were played that season.

2021
At the start of 2020/21 season, Wazito appointed experienced Francis Kimanzi  as head coach. Kimanzi has severally handled the Kenyan national team and helped Kenya attain its best-ever FIFA ranking, 68 in 2008. Wazito attained its best-ever finish in the top flight. They finished in the ninth position with 45 points.

2022
We can confirm that head coach Francis Kimanzi, his assistants Jeff Odongo and John Kamau, and the goalkeepers' coach Samuel Koko have left the club. we wish them well in their future endeavors.

Youth team head coach Fred Ambani assumes first-team duties in the interim with immediate effect.

References

External links
 

Football clubs in Kenya
University of Nairobi
University and college association football clubs
FKF Division One clubs
Sport in Nairobi